Fajrabad may refer to:
 Fajrabad, Ardabil
 Fajrabad, North Khorasan
 Fajrabad, West Azerbaijan